Mordellistena hirayamai is a beetle in the genus Mordellistena of the family Mordellidae. It was described in 1933 by Kônô.

References

hirayamai
Beetles described in 1933